The Minister of National Defense of El Salvador  is a Salvadoran military officer who serves as the head of the Ministry of National Defense of El Salvador.

History 

The position of Minister of National Defense was created on 1 March 1900 by President Tomás Regalado.

List of Ministers of Defense

See also 

President of El Salvador

References 

1900 establishments in El Salvador
Ministries established in 1900
Defence ministers of El Salvador